America's Ballroom Challenge is a competitive ballroom dance television series that aired on Public Broadcasting Service in the United States between 2006 and 2009.

It is part of the annual Ohio Star Ball, a festival of DanceSport in Columbus, Ohio.

Each season typically consists of competitions in five categories, with the first four categories devoted to each of the major styles of competitive ballroom dance:
 American Smooth: Waltz, Tango, Foxtrot, Viennese Waltz
 American Rhythm: Cha Cha, Rumba, East Coast Swing, Bolero, Mambo
 International Standard: Waltz, Tango, Viennese Waltz, Foxtrot, Quickstep
 International Latin: Cha Cha, Samba, Rumba, Paso Doble, Jive

The last category is a "Grand Finale" with the four champion couples competing for the title of "America's Best" dancers.

Episode guide

Season 1 (2006)
Hosted by Marilu Henner and Tony Meredith.

Season 2 (2007)
Hosted by Marilu Henner and Tony Meredith.

Season 3 (2008)
Hosted by Jasmine Guy and Ron Montez.

Season 4 (2009)
Hosted by Jean Louisa Kelly and Ron Montez.

The 2009 season (which would have aired in 2010) was not produced.

The 2010 season (which would have aired in 2011) was not produced.

Championship Ballroom Dancing
Prior to America's Ballroom Challenge, PBS was featuring Championship Ballroom Dancing, also from the Ohio Star Ball, annually since 1980.  The one-show event featured the final rounds of the International Standard and International Latin Styles of the competition with exhibitions in between usually by winners from other categories not shown on broadcast.

References

External links
Official PBS website
IMDb profile
TV.com summary

PBS original programming
Dancesport competitions
Dance competition television shows